Photo is a French men's magazine devoted to photography and erotica was previously published by Hachette Filipacchi Médias, and currently owned by EPMA.

History and profile
Photo was started by Hachette Filipacchi Médias as a monthly publication in 1967, and it was modeled on the men's magazine American Photo. The magazine is published ten times a year. It concentrates on the artistic aspects of photography, rather than technical aspects. The editorial line is tripartite: fashion/nude/glamour, historical images of wars/guillotines/poverty or similar, and selected journalism news photos from around the world. It is read and distributed around the world, and is known featuring naked models, colorful saturated graphic images, and its annual amateur photography contest. It was sold by Hachette Filipacchi in 2011.

An American edition was published under the name Photo World from 1973 to 1978.

See also
 List of men's magazines
 Pin-up model

References

External links
 Official web site
 Photo magazine collection

1960 establishments in France
French-language magazines
Magazines published in Paris
Monthly magazines published in France
Lagardère Active
Magazines established in 1967
Photography in France
Photography magazines
French art publications